The Clueless CD-ROM is a promotional product based on the Clueless film and television series released by Mattel Media in 1997 for Microsoft Windows and Macintosh. The CD-ROM is intended for girls age 8 and up, and includes a soundtrack, trivia, makeover and dress-up activities, and six video games.

References

External links
 https://www.mobygames.com/game/windows/clueless-cd-rom

1997 video games
Educational video games
Classic Mac OS games
Video games based on films
Video games developed in the United States
Windows games
Mattel video games